The Renfe Class 309 is a class of 20 three axle diesel-hydraulic locomotives shunters built by M.T.M. for Renfe, and introduced between 1986-7.

History and design

In the late 1970s Renfe began planning to modernise its shunting locomotives; initially modernisation of the Class 303 with new engines was considered and one locomotive converted, but the experiment was not carried forward. M.T.M. (Maquinista Terrestre y Marítima) offered its own development, and was successful: in July 1983 Renfe placed an order for 20 units.

The first units were delivered in the red-brown/yellow/white estrella livery in 1985 and were accepted into service in 1986 after correction of technical problems.

Initially the property of Renfe, after the creation of Adif the locomotives were divided between Mercancías (formerly Cargas freight) and Adif (infrastructure services). As of 2010 about half have been painted in a red and grey livery.

References

Literature
Manuel Galan Eruste, Locomotoras 309. In Maquetren n° 133, 2003.

External links
Renfe 309, image collection via www.flickr.com

Renfe Class 309
309
5 ft 6 in gauge locomotives
Railway locomotives introduced in 1986